Sergey Sergeevich Boldyrev I10 May 1991 Moscow) is a Russian musician, vocalist, guitarist, and song author who founded the Cloud Maze experimental rock-band.

Biography 
Boldyrev was born on 10 May 1991 in Moscow. At age seven. he started taking vocal lessons and at age 13 started writing songs.

In 2007, Boldyrev finished school and entered Financial University, seeking to become an economist. By age 23, he had graduated with two higher education diplomas, also finishing RANEPA .

Music career

The Shame 
In 2004 Boldyrev founded the band The Shame. In 2006, The Shame held its first concert  in Moscow.  In 2007, The Shame appeared in concert with Undervud . In 2009, The Shame broke up.

Cloud Maze 
After the breakup of The Shame, Boldyrev started a new band, Cloud Maze. In 2010, Cloud Maze band performed at a festival in Eupatoria with Aria.

In 2013, Cloud Maze started playing experimental pop-rock. In May 2013, the band went on an Italian tour, playing in Milan, Brescia, and Peschiera del Garda.  They were interviewed by two Italian radio stations. In October 2013, Cloud Maze toured with Adaen in Russia and Ukraine.

In fall 2014, Cloud Maze released its debut album Maybe, U Decide.  In October 2014, Cloud Maze toured Europe in support of the  debut album.  They performed in the Czech Republic, Italy, France, The Netherlands, Belgium and Germany. They conducted radio interviews during the tour.

In 2015, Rolling Stone magazine published an article about Boldyrev and Cloud Maze.  In March 2015, Boldyrev was interviewed by Jamendo.  In May 2015, Cloud Maze performed at the All That Matters music festival in Singapore.  That same year, they participated in a music festival in Crocus City Hall in Krasnogorsk, Russia.

In 2016, Cloud Maze was nominated for two music awards:
 Oops! Choice awards
 Real Award MusicBox

In 2017, Cloud Maze won the Jagermeister Music Awards 2017  and the music award in "People's Choice awards: Russia" nomination.

Awards 
 Oops! Choice awards 2016
 Jagermeister Music Awards 2017
 People's Choice awards: Russia

Bands 
1. "Cloud Maze" rock-band (2013 – current)

2. "The Shame" rock-band (2004–2013)

Videography and clips 
 Fall 2016, clip "TTL" on Russian MusicBox and  Muzika pervogo channels.
 Summer 2016, clip "Trick" on Russian MusicBox channel.
 Winter 2016, clip "Winter" on Russian MusicBox, NASHE TV and Muzika pervogo channels.
 Summer 2018, clip "Kleptocussion" broadcasting at Muzika pervogo channel.
 January 2019, "Doctor" clip release on 2x2 Music channel

TV Projects Participation 
 In 2011,  "Zvannij Uzhin" project on "Ren TV" channel
 In 2012, on Mtv channel
 In February, 2013,  "10 causes to fall in love" TV program on "Ю" channel
 "Perfect Proposal" on "Ю" channel
 2016, "Fashion Police" project on "CTC" channel
 2016,  "Friday" channel
 "Baryshnya Krestjanka" TV program

External links 
 "Celebrity TREND" publishing
 "Rolling Stone" magazine interview
 "Real Time Music" magazine interview
 "Jamendo" interview
 "Star Land" interview

Sources 
 https://ru.wikipedia.org/wiki/Болдырев,_Сергей_Сергеевич
 https://cloudmaze.ru
 :ru:Cloud Maze
 http://allreport.ru/muzyka/v-zaoblachnom-labirinte-s-gruppoj-cloud-maze/
 http://eclectic-magazine.ru/skandalnyj-klip-gruppy-cloud-maze/
 https://www.jamendo.com/artist/462768/cloud-maze?language=ru
 https://twitter.com/cloudmaze
 https://radiomayak.ru/persons/person/id/218385/
 http://www.chelmusic.ru/bands/2051.php

21st-century Russian male singers
21st-century Russian singers
Russian guitarists
Living people
1991 births